Petar Kochanov (born 31 January 1963) is a Bulgarian swimmer. He competed in three events at the 1980 Summer Olympics.

References

1963 births
Living people
Bulgarian male swimmers
Olympic swimmers of Bulgaria
Swimmers at the 1980 Summer Olympics
Place of birth missing (living people)